The United States National Security Council (NSC) is the principal forum used by the President of the United States for consideration of national security, military, and foreign policy matters. Based in the White House, it is part of the Executive Office of the President of the United States, and composed of senior national security advisors and Cabinet officials.

Since its inception in 1947 by President Harry S. Truman, the function of the Council has been to advise and assist the President on national security and foreign policies. It also serves as the President's principal arm for coordinating these policies among various government agencies. The Council has subsequently played a key role in most major events in U.S. foreign policy, from the Korean War to the War on Terror.

The NSC has counterparts in the national security councils of many other nations.

History

The immediate predecessor to the National Security Council was the National Intelligence Authority (NIA), which was established by President Harry S. Truman's Executive Letter of January 22, 1946, to oversee the Central Intelligence Group, the CIA's predecessor. The NIA was composed of the Secretary of State, the Secretary of War, the Secretary of the Navy, and the Chief of Staff to the Commander in Chief.

The National Security Council was created in 1947 by the National Security Act. It was created because policymakers felt that the diplomacy of the State Department was no longer adequate to contain the Soviet Union, in light of the tension between the Soviet Union and the United States. The intent was to ensure coordination and concurrence among the Army, Marine Corps, Navy, Air Force and other instruments of national security policy such as the Central Intelligence Agency (CIA), also created in the National Security Act. In 2004, the position of Director of National Intelligence (DNI) was created, taking over the responsibilities previously held by the head of CIA, the Director of Central Intelligence, as a cabinet-level position to oversee and coordinate activities of the Intelligence Community

On May 26, 2009, President Barack Obama merged the White House staff supporting the Homeland Security Council (HSC) and the National Security Council into one National Security Staff (NSS). The HSC and NSC each continue to exist by statute as bodies supporting the President. The name of the staff organization was changed back to National Security Council Staff in 2014.

The Directorate of Global Health Security and Biodefense was formed in 2016 under the Obama administration, disbanded in 2018 under the Trump Administration, and reinstated in January 2021 during the presidency of Joe Biden.

On January 29, 2017, President Donald Trump restructured the Principals Committee (a subset of the full National Security Council), while at the same time altering the attendance of the Chairman of the Joint Chiefs of Staff and Director of National Intelligence.

According to National Security Presidential Memorandum 2, the Chairman of the Joint Chiefs of Staff and Director of National Intelligence were to sit on the Principals Committee as and when matters pertaining to them arise, but will remain part of the full National Security Council. However, Chief of Staff Reince Priebus clarified the next day that they still are invited to attend meetings. With National Security Presidential Memorandum 4 in April 2017, the Director of National Intelligence and the Chairman of the Joint Chiefs of Staff "shall" attend Principals Committee meetings and included the Director of the Central Intelligence Agency as a regular attendee. The reorganization also placed the Administrator of the United States Agency for International Development as a permanent member of the Deputies Committee, winning moderate praise, while the White House Chief Strategist was removed.

Authority and powers
The National Security Council was established by the National Security Act of 1947 (PL 235 – 61 Stat. 496; U.S.C. 402), amended by the National Security Act Amendments of 1949 (63 Stat. 579; 50 U.S.C. 401 et seq.). Later in 1949, as part of the Reorganization Plan, the Council was placed in the Executive Office of the President.

The High Value Detainee Interrogation Group also reports to the NSC.

Kill authorizations

A secret National Security Council panel pursues the killing of an individual, including American citizens, who has been called a suspected terrorist. In this case, no public record of this decision or any operation to kill the suspect will be made available. The panel's actions are justified by "two principal legal theories": They "were permitted by Congress when it authorized the use of military forces against militants in the wake of the attacks of September 11, 2001; and they are permitted under international law if a country is defending itself."

Homeland Security Advisor John O. Brennan, who helped codify targeted killing criteria by creating the Disposition Matrix database, has described the Obama Administration targeted killing policy by stating that "in order to ensure that our counterterrorism operations involving the use of lethal force are legal, ethical, and wise, President Obama has demanded that we hold ourselves to the highest possible standards and processes".

Reuters reported that Anwar al-Awlaki, an American citizen, was on such a kill list and was killed accordingly.

On February 4, 2013, NBC published a leaked Department of Justice memo providing a summary of the rationale used to justify targeted killing of US citizens who are senior operational leaders of Al-Qa'ida or associated forces.

Membership
The National Security Council, as of 2021 and as per statute and National Security Memorandum–2, is chaired by the President. Its members are the Vice President (statutory), the Secretary of State (statutory), the Secretary of the Treasury (statutory), the Secretary of Defense (statutory), the Secretary of Energy (statutory), the Assistant to the President for National Security Affairs (non-statutory), the Assistant to the President and Director of the Office of Science and Technology Policy (non-statutory), the Attorney General (non-statutory),  the Secretary of Homeland Security (non-statutory), and the Representative of the United States to the United Nations (non-statutory).

The Chairman of the Joint Chiefs of Staff is the military advisor to the Council, the Director of National Intelligence is the intelligence advisor, and the Director of National Drug Control Policy is the drug control policy advisor. The Chief of Staff to the President, White House Counsel, and the Assistant to the President for Economic Policy are also regularly invited to attend NSC meetings. The Attorney General, the Director of the Office of Management and Budget and the Director of the Central Intelligence Agency are invited to attend meetings pertaining to their responsibilities. The heads of other executive departments and agencies, as well as other senior officials, are invited to attend meetings of the NSC when appropriate.

Principals Committee
The Principals Committee of the National Security Council is the Cabinet-level senior interagency forum for consideration of national security policy issues. The Principals Committee is convened and chaired by the National Security Advisor. The regular attendees of the Principals Committee are the Secretary of State, the Secretary of the Treasury, the Secretary of Defense, the Attorney General, the Secretary of Energy, the Secretary of Homeland Security, the White House Chief of Staff, the Director of National Intelligence, the Chairman of the Joint Chiefs of Staff, the Director of the Central Intelligence Agency, the Homeland Security Advisor, and the United States Ambassador to the United Nations.

The White House Counsel, the Deputy Counsel to the President for National Security Affairs, the Director of the Office of Management and Budget, the Deputy National Security Advisor, the Deputy National Security Advisor for Strategy, the National Security Advisor to the Vice President, and the NSC Executive Secretary may also attend all meetings of the Principals Committee. When considering international economic issues, the Principals Committee's regular attendees will include the Secretary of Commerce, the United States Trade Representative, and the Assistant to the President for Economic Policy.

Deputies Committee
The National Security Council Deputies Committee is the senior sub-Cabinet interagency forum for consideration of national security policy issues. The Deputies Committee is also responsible for reviewing and monitoring the interagency national security process including for establishing and directing the Policy Coordination Committees. The Deputies Committee is convened and chaired by the Deputy National Security Advisor or the Deputy Homeland Security Advisor.

Regular members of the Deputies Committee are the Deputy National Security Advisor for Strategy, the Deputy Secretary of State, Deputy Secretary of the Treasury, the Deputy Secretary of Defense, the Deputy Attorney General, the Deputy Secretary of Energy, the Deputy Secretary of Homeland Security, the Deputy Director of the Office of Management and Budget, the Deputy Director of National Intelligence, the Vice Chairman of the Joint Chiefs of Staff, the National Security Advisor to the Vice President, the Administrator of the United States Agency for International Development, and the Deputy Director of the Central Intelligence Agency. Invitations to participate in or attend specific meetings are extended to Deputy or Under Secretary level of executive departments and agencies and to other senior officials when relevant issues are discussed. The Executive Secretary and the Deputy White House Counsel also attend. The relevant Senior Director on the National Security Council staff is also invited to attend when relevant.

Policy Coordination Committees
The Policy Coordination Committees of the National Security Council, established and directed by the Deputies Committee, are responsible for the management of the development and implementation of national security policies through interagency coordination. Policy Coordination Committees are the main day-to-day for interagency coordination of national security policy development, implementation and analysis in aide of the Deputies Committee and the Principals Committee. Policy Coordination Committees are chaired by Senior Directors on the National Security Council staff, or sometimes National Economic Council staff, with Assistant Secretary-level officials from the relevant executive department or agency acting as co-chairs.

Directorate of Global Health Security and Biodefense
The Directorate of Global Health Security and Biodefense, created by Barack Obama in 2016 in response to the 2014 Ebola outbreak, was responsible "to prepare for the next disease outbreak and prevent it from becoming an epidemic or pandemic." The directorate was disbanded when a May 2018 change in organizational structure by John Bolton, Trump's recently appointed head of the National Security Council, resulted in the effective elimination of the office then led by Rear Admiral Tim Ziemer, Sr. Director for Global Health Security and Biothreats. Remaining staff were moved to other NSC departments, prompting Ziemer's resignation, thus completing the elimination of the office.

The responsibilities that formerly belonged to the directorate, along with those of arms control and nonproliferation, and of weapons of mass destruction terrorism, were absorbed into a single new directorate, counterproliferation and biodefense, and assigned to Tim Morrison in July 2018 as director. Morrison characterized the consolidation as part of an overall NSC "reduction of force" and called it "specious" to say the office was "dissolved," describing the previous size of the organization as "bloat," and stating "That is why Trump began streamlining the NSC staff in 2017." Trump defended the 2018 cuts, describing the financial motivation, when questioned in a February 2020 press conference, suggesting that people on a pandemic response team are unnecessary between pandemics, saying "Some of the people we cut, they haven't been used for many, many years." No source of information could be found to support the president's statement, likely because the team was created in 2016 and disbanded in 2018. He continued: "And rather than spending the money — and I'm a business person — I don't like having thousands of people around when you don't need them." The size of the team before cuts was estimated at 430 people, but the "thousands" referenced by the president also included reduction in the staff numbers of the CDC.

In January 2021, the directorate was reinstated by President Joe Biden, who appointed Elizabeth Cameron as Senior Director for Global Health Security and Biodefense, a position she had previously held under the Obama administration and briefly under the Trump administration.

New members 
During his presidential transition, President-elect Joe Biden announced the creation of the position of U.S. Special Presidential Envoy for Climate, the occupant of which will be a member of the National Security Council.

Key staff
 Assistant to the President and National Security Advisor: Jake Sullivan
 Senior Advisor to the National Security Advisor: Ariana Berengaut
Deputy Assistant to the President & Chief of Staff and Executive Secretary for the National Security Council: Curtis Ried
Advisor to the Chief of Staff and Executive Secretary for the National Security Council: Medha Raj
Deputy Chief of Staff and Deputy Executive Secretary: Ryan Harper
Deputy Director for Visits and Diplomatic Affairs: Darius Edgerton
Associate Director for Visits and Diplomatic Affairs: Nicole Fasano
Director of Operations Gelila Teshome
 Assistant to the President and Principal Deputy National Security Advisor: Jonathan Finer
 Senior Advisor to the Principal Deputy National Security Advisor: Ella Lipin 
 Assistant to the President and Homeland Security Advisor and Deputy National Security Advisor: Elizabeth Sherwood-Randall
Deputy Homeland Security Advisor: Joshua Geltzer
Senior Advisor to the Homeland Security Advisor: Hilary Hurd
Senior Advisor to the Homeland Security Advisor: John MacWilliams
 Deputy Assistant to the President & Deputy National Security Advisor for Cyber and Emerging Technology: Anne Neuberger
 Deputy Assistant to the President, Deputy Director of the National Economic Council and Deputy National Security Advisor for International Economics: Mike Pyle  
 Assistant to the President, Deputy Counsel to the President and National Security Council Legal Advisor: John R. Phillips III
 Associate Counsel and Deputy Legal Advisor to the NSC: Ashley Deeks
Deputy Legal Advisor to the NSC: Capt. Florencio Yuzon (US Navy)
Director for Global Criminal Justice: Steven Hill
 Senior Director for Defense: Cara Abercrombie
Director for Defense Innovation and Cyber Policy: Lt. Col. Nadine Nally (US Army)
Director for Space Policy: Audrey Schaffer
Director for Strategic Capabilities: Brigadier General John Edwards (US Air Force)
Director for Military Personnel & Readiness/ Senior Advisor, Gender Policy Council: Cailin Crockett 
 Senior Director for Strategic Planning: Thomas Wright 
Director for Strategic Planning: Alexander Bick 
Director for Strategic Planning: Rebecca Lissner
Director for Strategic Planning: Brett Rosenberg 
 Senior Director for Partnerships and Global Engagement: Amanda Mansour 
Director for Partnerships: Jim Thompson 
 Senior Director for Legislative Affairs: Vacant
Director for Legislative Affairs: Amanda Lorman
Director for Legislative Affairs: Nicole Tisdale
Chief of Staff & Policy Advisor for Legislative Affairs: Gershom Sacks
 Senior Director for Global Health Security and Biodefense: Raj Panjabi
Director for Biodefense: Daniel Gastfriend
Director for Biotechnology Risks and Biological Weapon Nonproliferation: Megan Frisk
Director for Countering Biological Threats & Global Health Security: Mark Lucera
Director for Medical and Biodefense Preparedness/ Director for International COVID Response: Hilary Marston
Senior Advisor and Director for Emerging Biological Threats: Maureen Bartee
Deputy Assistant to the President & Co-ordinator for the Indo-Pacific: Kurt M. Campbell
Senior Director for East Asia and Oceania: Edgard Kagan
Director for East Asia: Christopher Johnstone
Director for Southeast Asia and the Pacific Islands: Kathryn Paik
Senior Director for South Asia: Sumona Guha
Senior Director for China: Laura Rosenberger
Director for China: Rush Doshi
Director for China: Julian Gewirtz
Special Assistant, National Security Council Indo-Pacific Directorate: Sarah Donilon
 Co-ordinator for Technology and National Security: Jason Matheny
Senior Director for Technology and National Security: Tarun Chhabra
Director for Technology and National Security: Saif M. Khan
Director for Technology and National Security: Michelle Rozo
Director for Technology and National Security: Sarah Stalker-Lehoux
Director for Technology and Democracy: Chanan Weissman
 Senior Director for Resilience and Response: Caitlin Durkovich 
Director for Resilience and Response: Nabeela Barbari
Director for Resilience and Response: Capt. Jason Tama (US Coast Guard)
 Senior Director for Intelligence Programs: Maher Bitar
Director for Information Sharing and Identity Intelligence: Lauren Hartje
Senior Director for Development, Global Health & Humanitarian Response: Linda Etim
Director for Global Health: Ladan Fakory
Director for Global Health Response: Nidhi Bouri
Director for Humanitarian Coordination: Rachel Grant
Director for Refugees: Jacqui Pilch
 Senior Director for Western Hemisphere Affairs: Juan Gonzalez
Special Assistant to the Senior Director for Western Hemisphere Affairs: Alejandra Gonzalez
Director for the Caribbean and Summit of the Americas: Neda Brown
Director for Central America and Haiti: Megan Oates
Director for North America: Isabel Rioja-Scott
Director for Regional Protection and Migration Management: Eric Sigmon
 Senior Director for International Economics and Competitiveness: Peter Harrell 
Director for International Economics and Competitiveness: Adam Deutsch 
Director for International Economics and Competitiveness: Jessica McBroom 
Director for Digital Technology Policy and International Economics: Ruth Berry 
 Senior Director for International Economics and Labor: Jennifer M. Harris 
Director for International Economics: Brian Janovitz 
Director for International Economics: Mimi Wang 
Director for Strategic Workforce Planning: Leila Elmergawi 
 Coordinator for Strategic Communications: John Kirby
 Senior Director for Press & NSC Spokesperson: Adrienne Watson 
Director of Strategic Communications/ Assistant Press Secretary: Patrick Evans
Director of Strategic Communications/ Assistant Press Secretary: Dean Lieberman 
Director of Strategic Communications/ Assistant Press Secretary: Kedenard Raymond 
Director of Strategic Communications/ Assistant Press Secretary: Sean Savett 
Director of Strategic Communications/ Assistant Press Secretary: Saloni Sharma
Policy Advisor, Office of the Spokesperson and Senior Director for Press/ Strategic Communications: Jasmine Williams 
 Co-ordinator for the Southern Border: Vacant
Senior Director for Africa: Dana L. Banks
Director for African Affairs: F. David Diaz
Director for African Affairs: Peter Quaranto
Director for Africa: Deniece Laurent-Mantey
Special Advisor for Africa Strategy: Judd Devermont
 Co-ordinator for Democracy and Human Rights: Shanthi Kalathil 
Senior Director for Democracy and Human Rights: Robert G. Berschinski 
Director for Democracy and Human Rights: Tess McEnery
Director for Democracy and Human Rights: Brian Vogt
Director for Human Rights and Civil Society: Jesse Bernstein 
Director for Anticorruption: Chandana Ravi 
 Senior Director for Russia and Central Asia: Eric Green
Director for Afghanistan: Allison Varricchio
Director for Russia: Katrina Elledge
 Senior Director for Counter-terrorism: Clare Linkins
Director for Counter-terrorism: Caitlin Conley
Director for Counter-terrorism: Alexandra Miller
Director for Counter-terrorism: Annie Rohroff
Director for Counter-terrorism - Global Threats / Embassy Security:  Derek Dela-Cruz
Director for Counter-terrorism - Homeland Threats:  Michael Massetti
Director for Threat Finance & Sanctions: Samantha Sultoon
Director for Counternarcotics: Coqui Baez Gonzalez
 Senior Director for Europe: Amanda Sloat
Director for Balkans and Central Europe: Robin Brooks
Co-ordinator for Middle East and North Africa: Brett McGurk
Senior Director for Middle East and North Africa: Stephanie Hallett (acting)
Director for Gulf Affairs: Stephanie Hallett 
Director for the Arabian Peninsula: Evyenia Sidereas
Director for Iran: Sam Martin
Director for Iraq and Syria: Zehra Bell
Director for Israeli-Palestinian Affairs: Julie Sawyer
Director for Jordan and Lebanon: Maxwell Martin
Director for North African Affairs: Josh Harris
Director for Political-Military Affairs and Yemen: K.C. Evans
Director for Political-Military Affairs: Col. Daniel Mouton (US Army)
 Senior Director for Energy & Climate Change: Melaine Nakagawa
Director for Climate Diplomacy and Energy Transformation: Helaina Matza
Director for Climate Investment, Trade, and Environment: Victoria Orero
Director for Climate Security and Resilience: Jennifer DeCesaro
 Senior Director for Speechwriting and Strategic Initiatives: Carlyn Reichel 
 Senior Director for Multilateral Affairs: 
Director for Global Engagement and Multilateral Diplomacy at the NSC and NEC: Andy Rabens
Director for Multilateral Initiatives: Negah Angha
 Senior Director for Arms Control, Disarmament & Non-Proliferation: TBC 
 Senior Director for Cyber: Andrew Scott
Director for International Cyber Policy: Teddy Nemeroff
 Senior Director for Cybersecurity and Policy: Steven Kelly
Director for Cybersecurity and Emerging Technology Policy: Jonah Force Hill
Director for Critical Infrastructure Cybersecurity: Elke Sobieraj
Director for Cybersecurity Policy and Cyber Incident Response: Travis Berent
Senior Director for Trans-border: Katie Tobin
Director for Trans-border Security: Ashley Feasley

See also

 Homeland Security Advisor
 Iran–Contra affair
 National Security Medal
 National Security Advisor
 National Coordinator for Security, Infrastructure Protection and Counter-Terrorism
 Targeted killing
 Title 32 of the Code of Federal Regulations
 Tower Commission
 Trump–Ukraine scandal
 Homeland Security Council

References

Further reading

 Bahadir, Sanli. "Arzin Merkezine Seyahat: ABD Ulusal Güvenlik Konseyi" ["Journey to the Center of the World: U.S. National Security Council"]. Article on US NSC .
 Best, Richard A., Jr. "The National Security Council: An Organizational Assessment". (Congressional Research Service, 2009) online.
 Bolton, M. Kent. U.S. National Security and Foreign Policymaking After 9/11: Present at the Re-Creation, Rowman & Littlefield; 2007, .
 Brown, Cody M. The National Security Council: A Legal History of the President's Most Powerful Advisers, Project on National Security Reform (2008).
 Cutler, Robert. "The Development of the National Security Council". Foreign Affairs 34.3 (1956): 441-458. .
 Daalder, Ivo H. and I. M. Destler, In the Shadow of the Oval Office: Profiles of the National Security Advisers and the Presidents They Served—From JFK to George W. Bush. Simon & Schuster; 2009, .
 Annual Report to Congress on White House Office Staff; Executive Office of the President, Wednesday, July 1, 2009
 Falk, Stanley L. "The National Security Council Under Truman, Eisenhower, and Kennedy". Political Science Quarterly 79.3 (1964): 403–434. .
 Gans, John. White House Warriors: How the National Security Council Transformed the American Way of War (Liveright, 2019). online review.
 Karl F. Inderfurth and Loch K. Johnson, eds. Fateful Decisions: Inside the National Security Council. Oxford University Press, 2004. .
 Nelson, Anna Kasten. "President Truman and the Evolution of the National Security Council". Journal of American History 72.2 (1985): 360–378. .
 Nelson, Anna Kasten. "The 'top of policy hill': President Eisenhower and the National Security Council". Diplomatic History 7.4 (1983): 307–326. .
 
 Rothkopf, David J. (March/April 2005). "Inside the Committee that Runs the World" (Archived copy, including missing image). Foreign Policy.
 David J. Rothkopf, Running The World: the Inside Story of the National Security Council and the Architects of American Power, PublicAffairs; 2006, .
 Sander, Alfred D. "Truman and the National Security Council: 1945–1947". Journal of American History (1972): 369–388. .
  Advocates for a "National Board of Strategy".
 Whittaker, Alan G., Frederick C. Smith, and Elizabeth McKune. The national security policy process: The national security council and interagency system (Industrial College of the Armed Forces, 2008).

External links

 Official National Security Council website
 History of the NSC from the White House
 Records of the National Security Council (NSC) in the National Archives
 White House Office, National Security Council Staff Papers, 1948–1961, Dwight D. Eisenhower Presidential Library
 Homeland Security Watch (www.HLSwatch.com) provides current details on the NSC as it pertains to homeland security.
 
 

 
Anti-communism in the United States
Executive Office of the President of the United States
United States
1947 establishments in the United States
United States diplomacy